Herbert Watson Thomas (April 6, 1923 – August 9, 2000) was a stock car racer who was one of NASCAR's most successful drivers in the 1950s. Thomas was NASCAR's first multi-time Cup Champion.

Background
Born in the small town of Olivia, North Carolina, Thomas worked as a farmer and worked in a sawmill in the 1940s before his interest turned to auto racing.

NASCAR career
In 1949, Thomas took part in NASCAR's first Strictly Stock (the forerunner to the Grand National and ultimately the modern NASCAR Cup Series) race and made four starts in the series' first year. The following year, he made thirteen appearances in the series, now renamed the Grand National division. He scored his first career win at Martinsville Speedway in a privateer Plymouth.

He started the 1951 season with moderate success in his Plymouth (plus one win in an Oldsmobile) before switching to a Hudson Hornet, at the suggestion of fellow driver Marshall Teague. Thomas won the Southern 500 rather handily in what was famously dubbed "The Fabulous Hudson Hornet", which would be the first of six wins in two months. His late charge helped him narrowly defeat Fonty Flock to win the Grand National championship. With help from crew chief Smokey Yunick, Thomas subsequently became the first owner/driver to take the championship in the process.

In 1952, Thomas and his Hornet were involved in a close championship race with another Flock, Fonty's younger brother Tim. The two drivers won 8 races in their respective Hudsons, but Flock came out on top at the end, despite another late-season charge from Thomas.

He returned with a vengeance in 1953 and dominated the entire season, winning a series-best twelve races en route to becoming the first two-time series champion. Thomas won twelve races again in 1954, including a second Southern 500 win (making him the first driver to win twice at Darlington), but he was beaten by a more consistent Lee Petty in the championship standings.

After four successful years in a Hudson, Thomas began driving Chevrolets and Buicks in races in 1955. He crashed heavily behind the wheel of a Buick at a race in Charlotte, forcing him to miss three months of the season. He returned to score his third Southern 500 win in his Motoramic Chevy, one of three wins during the season. He finished 5th in the championship on the strength of his win at Darlington.

In 1956, Thomas briefly abandoned being an owner/driver and, after winning a race for himself early in the season, he drove for two other owners. He won once for Yunick, after which the two broke ties, and three consecutive races while driving Chryslers for Carl Kiekhaefer, then dominating NASCAR with the first professional team. Thomas eventually returned to being an owner/driver at season's end, and had clinched second behind Petty in the championship when he was severely injured at a race in Shelby, North Carolina. The wreck effectively ended his NASCAR career, though he had two starts in 1957 and one in 1962 without success. The three consecutive wins would end up being his final three wins.

Career summary
Thomas ended his career with 48 victories, which currently ranks 14th all-time. He won 21.05% of his starts(48 wins/228 starts) during his career, which ranks as the highest win percentage all-time among drivers with 100 career starts.

Brother Donald
Herb's younger brother Donald made 79 starts in the Grand National division between 1950 and 1956, winning at Atlanta's Lakewood Speedway in 1952. Donald was the youngest driver to ever win a race in series history until Kyle Busch broke the record in 2005.

Awards
Thomas was inducted into the International Motorsports Hall of Fame in 1994 and was named one of NASCAR's 50 Greatest Drivers in 1998.

Thomas was inducted into the NASCAR Hall of Fame on February 8, 2013.

He was inducted into the Motorsports Hall of Fame of America in 2017.

He and the Fabulous Hudson Hornet are on a historical mural on the side of a building at 133 N. Steele Street that was commissioned in 2016 by the City of Sanford.

Death
On August 9, 2000, Thomas suffered a heart attack and died in Sanford, North Carolina.

Motorsports career results

NASCAR
(key) (Bold – Pole position awarded by qualifying time. Italics – Pole position earned by points standings or practice time. * – Most laps led. ** – All laps led.)

Grand National Series

References

External links

Article on Thomas' passing 

1923 births
2000 deaths
Burials in North Carolina
International Motorsports Hall of Fame inductees
NASCAR Cup Series champions
NASCAR drivers
People from Harnett County, North Carolina
Racing drivers from North Carolina
Hudson Motor Car Company
NASCAR Hall of Fame inductees